The solitaires are medium-sized mostly insectivorous birds in the genera Myadestes, Cichlopsis and Entomodestes of the thrush family Turdidae.

Taxonomy
Although all three genera of solitaires are morphologically similar, genetic studies have indicated that they are not particularly closely related. The genus Myadestes is in the basal clade of the family Turdidae, along with the genera Sialia (the bluebirds) and Neocossyphus (African ant-thrushes).

Species list
Thrushes in three genera are called "solitaires":
 Genus Myadestes 12 species, including 1 now extinct, found in Hawaii, the Americas and the Caribbean
 Ōmao, Myadestes obscurus
 kāmao, Myadestes myadestinus
 Olomao, Myadestes lanaiensis
 Puaiohi, Myadestes palmeri
 Townsend's solitaire, Myadestes townsendi
 Brown-backed solitaire, Myadestes occidentalis
 Cuban solitaire, Myadestes elisabeth
 Rufous-throated solitaire, Myadestes genibarbis
 Black-faced solitaire, Myadestes melanops
 Varied solitaire, Myadestes coloratus
 Andean solitaire, Myadestes ralloides
 Slate-colored solitaire, Myadestes unicolor

 Genus Cichlopsis: 1 species, found to South America
Rufous-brown solitaire, Cichlopsis leucogenys

 Genus Entomodestes: 2 species, found in South America
White-eared solitaire, Entomodestes leucotis
Black solitaire, Entomodestes coracinus

References

Turdidae
Bird common names